Alexandru Sirițeanu (born 16 April 1984) is a Romanian sabre fencer who competed in the 2012 Summer Olympics winning a silver medal in the sabre team event as a reserve.

References

External links
 Profile at Nahouw
 

1984 births
Living people
Romanian male fencers
Romanian sabre fencers
Fencers at the 2012 Summer Olympics
Olympic fencers of Romania
Olympic medalists in fencing
Olympic silver medalists for Romania
Medalists at the 2012 Summer Olympics